Superintendent (Supt) is a rank in the British police and in most English-speaking Commonwealth nations. In many Commonwealth countries, the full version is superintendent of police (SP). The rank is also used in most British Overseas Territories and in many former British colonies. In some countries, such as Italy, the rank of superintendent is a low rank.

Rank insignia of superintendent

Superintendent in several countries

Australia 
In Australia, the rank of superintendent is the next senior rank from chief Inspector and is less senior than a chief superintendent (Victoria Police, South Australia Police, New South Wales Police, Queensland Police) or an assistant commissioner (Western Australia Police).
Some officers also hold the rank of detective chief superintendent (though this is seldom used) and detective superintendent.
Superintendents wear an epaulette bearing one pip below a crown, the same rank badge as a lieutenant-colonel and wear police caps with a laurel wreath across the brim to indicate seniority.

Canada 
In Canada, the rank of superintendent is usually the next senior rank up from inspector. Some police forces also have the higher rank of staff superintendent (senior staff superintendent) or regional superintendent.

Hong Kong 
Hong Kong Police Force ranks are based on the British system:
Chief superintendent – in command of a branch or district formation
Senior superintendent – second in charge of a district or commander of a bureau
Superintendent – in command of HQ unit or police division

India 

In India, a superintendent of police (SP)  heads the police force of a district or is in charge of a large urban or rural area in a district. Their rank badge is the state emblem above no star or one star. The rank below it is assistant deputy commissioner of police (A.DCP)  or deputy superintendent of police (Dy.SP), while the rank above it is senior superintendent of police (SSP) or deputy commissioner of police. In the state of Kerala, superintendents of police in charge of districts are called District Police chiefs.

Ireland 
In the Republic of Ireland the rank of superintendent is between inspector and chief superintendent. There are usually two or three assigned to each division. Detectives use the "detective" prefix. There were 178 superintendents in the Garda Síochána at the beginning of 2006. In the Irish language, a Garda superintendent is a ceannfort, which translates literally as "headman". Ard-Cheannfort is a chief superintendent or "high headman". Ceannfort is also used for the military rank of "commandant", equivalent to major.

Each police district is commanded by a superintendent. Districts are sub-units of divisions, which are commanded by chief superintendents.

Italy 
In the Italian Polizia di Stato, the ranks of superintendent (sovrintendente) are medium-level non-commissioned officers' ranks, senior to agents and assistants and junior to inspectors. In official comparisons, they are equivalent to sergeants. The three ranks are vice sovrintendente (deputy superintendent), sovrintendente (superintendent), and sovrintendente capo (chief superintendent).

Macau 
Superintendent general and superintendent are, respectively, the ranks of the commander and deputy commanders of the Public Security Police (CPSP) of Macau. The rank of superintendent is senior to the rank of intendent.

The CPSP rank insignia follows the generic model of the Portuguese Public Security Police, with the insignia of senior officers consisting of epaulets that contain two crossed horsewhips inside a laurel wreath and PSP stars (six-point silver star with the "SP" monogram in the center) whose number defines the precise rank. The number of stars in the insignia of superintendent general and superintendent are, respectively, four and three. The rank insignia of superintendent general and superintendent are also distinguished in being in red epaulets instead of the dark blue of the other ranks.

New Zealand 
In New Zealand, the rank of superintendent is above inspector and below assistant commissioner. Superintendents are typically appointed as district commanders or directors of service centres, and the rank is also held by the commandant of the Royal New Zealand Police College.

Pakistan 
In Pakistan, a senior superintendent of police is the head of the district police. Some districts and police divisions are commanded by superintendents of police. The police service of Pakistan now identifies a new hierarchy including DPO (District Police Officer), CCPO (Capital City Police Officer) etc. Superintendent of Police is equivalent to DPO [or CPO (City Police Officer) in smaller districts] and can be a CSP recruit belonging to PSP (Police Service of Pakistan) and can also be a ranker.

Papua New Guinea 
In the Royal Papua New Guinea Constabulary, the rank of superintendent is above chief inspector and below chief superintendent.

Philippines 
In the Philippines, superintendent is a rank in the Philippine National Police, the Bureau of Jail Management and Penology, and the Bureau of Fire Protection. It is above chief inspector and below senior superintendent and is regarded as the equivalent of lieutenant colonel in the Philippine Army.

Portugal 
In Portugal, superintendent is an officer rank in the Public Security Police (PSP). It is senior to the police rank of intendant and inferior to the rank of chief superintendent, being roughly equivalent to a colonel in the military.

Superintendents usually exercise the role of commanding officers of district commands or the role of second-in-command in the metropolitan and regional commands.

The rank insignia of a superintendent consists of a dark blue epaulet with two crossed horsewhips inside a laurel wreath and three PSP stars arranged in an inverted triangle. Each PSP star consists of a six-point silver star with the "SP" monogram in the center.

Singapore 
In Singapore, the rank is used in both the police (SPF) and immigration authorities (ICA) as both use the same rank structure. In the police, there are three ranks of superintendent: assistant superintendent of police (ASP), deputy superintendent of police (DSP), and superintendent of police (SP). These three ranks fall under the senior police officer category.

South Africa

Pre-Union
The rank was introduced in 1825, for the head of the Cape Town police.  It was discontinued in 1860.

It was also used in the short-lived Griqualand Mounted Police from 1873 to 1880 and in the Natal Police from 1894 to 1913, the Transvaal Town Police from 1901 to 1908, the Transvaal Police from 1908 to 1913, and the Orange River Colony Police from 1908 to 1913.

Post-Union
The rank reappeared in the Union of South Africa as the rank of the head of the South African Railways & Harbours Police in 1944.  It was equivalent to the military rank of colonel, with the same rank insignia.  From 1946, there were three grades:  chief superintendent (brigadier), deputy chief superintendent (colonel), and superintendent (lieutenant-colonel).  The police titles were replaced by the military titles in the 1960s.

The title was reinstated for the South African Police Service in 1995.  There were two grades: senior superintendent (equivalent to colonel) and superintendent (lieutenant-colonel).  The police titles were replaced by the military titles in 2010.

Sri Lanka
In Sri Lanka, superintendent of police (SP) is a senior gazetted officer rank senior to assistant superintendent of police and junior to senior superintendent of police. The latter was created in the 1980s. Superintendents are typically appointed as regional commanders of police divisions.

United Kingdom 

The rank of superintendent is senior to chief inspector and junior to chief superintendent. The rank badge is a crown worn on the epaulettes, the same as a major in the British Army.

Metropolitan Police 
The rank of superintendent was introduced at the foundation of the Metropolitan Police in 1829. Each division was commanded by a superintendent. The rank below superintendent was originally inspector until the introduction of chief inspector in 1868. Originally, only the commissioners held a higher rank than superintendent (and they were not sworn police officers). In 1839, Captain William Hay was appointed to the new rank of inspecting superintendent, replaced by assistant commissioner in 1856. The rank of district superintendent was introduced between superintendent and assistant commissioner in 1869, and was renamed chief constable in 1886.

The rank of superintendent was also adopted in the Detective Branch (later the Criminal Investigation Department) from 1868, when Adolphus Williamson, the first head of the branch, was promoted to the rank.

In 1949, Metropolitan Police superintendents were regraded to the new rank of chief superintendent, chief inspectors were regraded to superintendent, and sub-divisional inspectors and divisional detective inspectors were regraded to chief inspector (with those ranks being abolished).

In September 1953, there was another change, when the rank was split into superintendent grade I (current superintendents, chief inspectors commanding sub-divisions and detective chief inspectors commanding divisional CIDs) and superintendent grade II (other current chief inspectors), with a redefined rank of chief inspector being created for senior inspectors. Superintendents grade II wore the crown (the rank badge formerly worn by chief inspectors), with superintendents grade I wearing a crown over a pip (the rank badge formerly worn by superintendents). This lasted until 1974, when superintendent once more became a single rank, wearing a crown on the epaulettes.

From January 1954 there was one superintendent grade I and one chief inspector in each sub-division, one chief superintendent, one superintendent grade II and one detective superintendent grade I in each division, and one commander, one deputy commander, one detective chief superintendent, and one detective superintendent grade II in each district. A detective chief inspector was added in each division later in 1954.

Other British forces 
In most other forces, superintendent lay between inspector and assistant chief constable until well into the 20th century. In many smaller forces, the senior superintendent was also the ACC. Some forces had chief inspectors, and some later acquired chief superintendents, but this was by no means universal. Today, however, every force in the country has all three ranks.

Salary 
A superintendent's starting salary, is UK£70,1734 rising to £82,881 after five years. These salaries may be affected by regional and competency pay allowances.

United States 
In the United States, superintendent is the title used for the head of certain police departments, such as the New Jersey State Police, Police Command Staff in New York State Police, Massachusetts State Police, Chicago Police Department, New Orleans Police Department, Ohio State Highway Patrol, Missouri State Highway Patrol, Oregon State Police, and Indiana State Police. In some police departments, superintendent is instead the title used to describe a position with responsibilities that would be given in other police departments to bureau or division chiefs, with examples being the Cambridge Police Department, Boston Police Department and Dayton, Ohio Police Department.

See also
Commissaire de police

Footnotes

References
Police Forces of the World, by William Hall Watson, Zeus Publications 2006, 

Police ranks
Police ranks of India
Police ranks of Pakistan
Police ranks in the United Kingdom
Police ranks of Sri Lanka